Thee Nagar is a 2007 Tamil-language action film directed by  Thirumalai. It starred Karan and Udhayathara in lead roles, while Shanmugarajan, Scissor Manohar, Kadhal Sukumar, and Meera Krishnan play supporting roles. The soundtrack was composed by Jassie Gift with cinematography by Suresh Devan. The film released on 27 July 2007.

Plot
Yamaha Murugan (Karan) is a do-gooder who commands respect from the students community for his good deed as the students chairman in a city college. Unable to find a lucrative job, he sets up a tea shop in front of the college. From here, he passed out. Life goes smooth for Murugan until he comes across a corrupt cop FIR Murthy (Shanmugarajan). Murugan is targeted for no fault of his by Murthy. Nadhiya (Udhayathara), a girl next door, falls for Murugan's good conduct, and both develop romance. However, a bloody duel between Murugan and Murthy brings a change in the former's life. The rest is the battle between the two to assert their supremacy over one other that ends with a riveting climax.

Cast

Soundtrack
The soundtrack was composed by Jassie Gift.
"Ayiram Ayiram Koilkalai Vida" - Pradin Thomas, Abhinav, Jose
"Kadavul Ethukku Kadhal Irukku" - K. S. Chitra,
"Neeye En Soma Baaname" - Jassie Gift, Reshmi,
"Oothu Oothuda" - Naveen, Anupama, Saindhavi,
"Potta Pulla Venumaadi" - Prasanna, Sujatha,
"Thaliyum Vendam Veliyum Vendam" - Naveen, Sujatha

Critical reception
Indiaglitz wrote "Director Thirumalai deserves credit for coming up with a movie that is fairly engaging." Sify wrote "There is nothing new in story or presentation and the film sags towards the climax, and is a total let down. Thirumalai, the director has etched the plot of the film from Dharani?s action movie Dhil, added some masala, and remixed it".

References

2007 films
2000s Tamil-language films
Indian action films
2000s masala films
2007 action films